Increase Mather (June 21, 1639 Old Style – August 23, 1723 Old Style) was a New England Puritan clergyman in the Massachusetts Bay Colony and president of Harvard College for twenty years (1681–1701). He was influential in the administration of the colony during a time that coincided with the notorious Salem witch trials.

Biography

Early life
Mather was born in Dorchester, Massachusetts Bay Colony, on June 21, 1639, to the Rev. Richard Mather and Kathrine Holt Mather, following their participation in the Great Migration from England due to their nonconformity to the Church of England.

The stated reason for his first name was "...the never-to-be-forgotten increase, of every sort, wherewith God favoured the country about the time of his nativity." The name "Increase" is a literal translation of the Hebrew "Yosëf" (Joseph). He was the youngest of six brothers, the others being Samuel, Nathaniel, Eleazar, Joseph, and Timothy. The first three of these also became ministers.

Education
In 1651, Mather was admitted to Harvard College, where he roomed with and studied under Robert Massey. When he graduated in 1656, aged 17, with a Bachelor of Arts, he began to train for the ministry, and gave his first sermon on his 18th birthday. He quickly left Massachusetts and went to Ireland, where he studied at Trinity College, Dublin, for a Master of Arts. During his time at Trinity College he was licensed as a Commonwealth Minister by Oliver Cromwell to the joint charge of St Tida's Church (Ballyscullion), and St Swithan's Church (Magherafelt). He graduated in 1658, and worked as a chaplain attached to a garrison in the Channel Islands from 1659 to 1661 with a short stint at a church in Gloucester in 1660.

After Cromwell's death in 1658, Mather felt less secure in his post in the Channel Islands due to Charles II's return to the throne. He resigned the position in 1660 and sailed for Boston in 1661. Harvard later awarded Mather the first honorary degree in the New World; he became a Doctor of Sacred Theology in 1692.

Establishing himself in Massachusetts
In 1661, with the advent of the English Restoration and resurgence of Anglicanism, Increase returned to Massachusetts, where he married Maria Cotton. She was his step-sister by virtue of his father's marriage to Sarah Hankredge, widow of John Cotton and mother of Maria. Maria gave birth to Cotton Mather in 1663. In 1676, Increase published A Brief History of the War with the Indians in New-England, a contemporary account of King Philip's War.

He was ordained as minister of the North Church. He held this post until he died.

Harvard College
In his autobiography, Increase Mather writes that he was President of Harvard from 1681 until 1701, but due to charter and organizational changes, his official title varied. On June 11, 1685, he was made Acting President and on July 23, 1686, he was appointed Rector. On June 27, 1692, he finished writing the new college charter and became president. On September 5, 1692, while the Salem trials were still ongoing, Increase Mather was awarded a doctorate of divinity, the first doctorate issued at Harvard, and the last for 79 years.

He was rarely present on campus or in the town, especially during his term of Rector, as he was out of the Colony for all but two years of his term in that office. Despite his absences he did make some changes: re-implementation of Greek and Hebrew instruction, replacement of classical Roman authors with Biblical and Christian authors in ethics classes, enactment of requirements that students attend classes regularly, live and eat on campus, and that seniors not haze other students.

Involvement in politics
While politics and Puritan religion were closely related during Increase's lifetime, his first direct involvement with politics occurred as a result of James II of England's manipulation of the New England governments. In 1686, James revoked the Charter of Massachusetts in the process of creating the Dominion of New England.

The Dominion was headed by Edmund Andros, who not only disliked puritanism and was haughty, but ruled as a near-absolute dictator: Town meetings were outlawed, leaving the Dominion without consent of the governed, marriage was removed from the clergy, and the Old South Church was temporarily appropriated for Anglican services.

The 1687 Declaration of Indulgence, prohibiting discrimination against Catholics, saw staunch opposition from the Puritan establishment. When Mather successfully roused opposition to revocation of the charter, he was nearly framed for treason. He traveled to London (eluding spies out to catch him) to petition the King. While engaged in petitioning he published pieces to build popular support for his positions, such as A Narrative of the Miseries of New-England, By Reason of an Arbitrary Government Erected there Under Sir Edmund Andros (1688) and A Brief Relation for the Confirmation of Charter Privileges (1691).

He attempted to restore the old charter and obtain a royal charter for Harvard; however, he abandoned that course and changed his petitions, favoring a new charter not lacking any of the rights previously granted. Following the Glorious Revolution and subsequent overthrow of Andros, a new charter was granted to the colony. The 1692 charter was a major departure from its predecessor, granting sweeping home rule, establishing an elective legislature, enfranchising all freeholders (previously only men admitted to a congregation could vote), and uniting the Massachusetts Bay Colony and Plymouth Colony. Following Andros' deposition and arrest, he had William Phips appointed as Royal Governor and they returned to Massachusetts, arriving on May 14, 1692. Following his return, the administration of Harvard grew increasingly insistent that he reside nearer to the institution. Not wanting to leave his Second Church, he did not do so, and eventually resigned the Presidency.

Early influence and involvement in the Salem witch trials
In 1681, the same year he became president of Harvard (and when his son Cotton Mather was only eighteen years old), Increase Mather began work on a manuscript that was to be a collection of "illustrious providences" and he solicited contributions from the other Puritan ministers. This work demonstrated a belated interest in witchcraft relative to the European continent, where witch trials had gone into a steep decline after reaching "peak intensity during the century 1570–1670" but this reflected a similar belated interest among a certain milieu in London around the same time. Increase Mather's book "Remarkable Providences" was published in 1684 and forwards a doctrinal belief in the real power of witchcraft. One of the more curious aspects of the book is that while it cites numerous Reformation theologians (Luther, Beza, Melancthon) and many well-known writers on witchcraft including Dominican inquisitor Heinrich Kramer (author of the notorious witch-hunting manual Malleus Maleficarum), it does not cite John Calvin.

In November 1692, he published Cases of Conscience Concerning Evil Spirits which defended the judges and trials, but also expressed words of caution, perhaps due to public pressure. In the postscript, included with the initial first edition of the book, he mentions his own attendance at the trial of George Burroughs and his agreement with the capital judgment against him. George Burroughs had been a fellow minister who seems to have substituted at the pulpit for Increase Mather on at least one occasion. Like his work from 1684, this 1692 work also cites Malleus Maleficarum.

Notwithstanding this, his reputation was not improved afterwards or for posterity due to his association with the trials as well as his subsequent refusal, for whatever reasons, to denounce them. He was also briefly mentioned in a thorough treatment of his son Cotton by Robert Calef in his comprehensive book of the Salem Trials and their aftermath, More Wonders of the Invisible World (referred to as More Wonders of the Spiritual World by the Encyclopædia Britannica Eleventh Edition). Increase Mather was said to have burned Calef's book in Harvard Yard.

Later life and death
 
In 1715, following the death of his wife Maria the previous year, he married Ann Cotton, widow of his nephew John.

Mather owned a slave named Spaniard.

On September 27, 1722, he fainted and was thereafter bedridden. In August 1723 he suffered bladder failure and died three weeks later on August 23, 1723, in Boston, aged 84. He was buried in Copp's Hill Burying Ground.

Before his death, he took lodging at the retreat of Mineral Spring Pond to recover from his illness and drink from the famous healing waters of the springs from Spring Pond.

Beliefs
Throughout his life Mather was a staunch Puritan, opposing anything openly contradictory to, mutually exclusive with, or potentially "distracting" from, his religious beliefs. He supported suppression of intoxication, unnecessary effort on Sundays and ostentatious clothing. He was initially opposed to the Half-Way Covenant but later supported it. He firmly believed in the direct appearance of God's disfavor in everyday life, e.g. the weather, political situations, attacks by Native Americans, fires and floods, etc.

He was strenuous in attempting to keep people to his idea of morality, making strong use of jeremiads to try to prevent indifference and especially to try to get government officials to enforce public morality. During his tenure at Harvard he regularly stamped out any relaxation of Puritan strictness, such as latitudinarianism, which had flourished during his overseas absence.

Following his acceptance of the Covenant, Solomon Stoddard and others attempted to further liberalize Puritanism by baptism of children who had nonmember parents and admittance of all but the openly immoral to services. To try to stop this, Mather had a synod called to outlaw similar measures. A declaration was adopted, but never made binding.

In popular culture
In John Neal's 1828 novel Rachel Dyer, Increase Mather appears at the end of Martha Corey's witchcraft trial to announce the guilty verdict and give a speech. He is also played by Stephen Lang in the 2014 TV series Salem.

Portraiture
A portrait of Increase Mather hangs in the Middle Common Room of Mansfield College, Oxford.

See also
Salem witch trials
Cotton Mather
John Ratcliff

References

Further reading
 Baker, Emerson W. A Storm of Witchcraft: The Salem Trials and the American Experience (2014)
 Kenneth Murdock, Increase Mather: The Foremost American Puritan (Harvard, 1925)
 Michael G. Hall. The Last American Puritan: The Life of Increase Mather. Wesleyan, 1992.
 Thomas James Holmes. Increase Mather: a Bibliography of his Works. Cleveland, 1931.
 Mason I. Lowance. Increase Mather. New York, 1974.
 Robert Middlekauff. The Mathers: Three Generations of Puritan Intellectuals, 1596–1728. New York, 1971.
 Kenneth B. Murdock. Increase Mather: The Foremost American Puritan. Cambridge, Massachusetts, 1925.
 Increase Mather's Catechismus Logicus: "A Translation and an  Analysis of the Role of a Ramist Catechism at Harvard"], co-authored with Thomas Knoles,  Proceedings of the American Antiquarian Society'' 109 (1999): 145–181[http://www.americanantiquarian.org/proceedings/44525172.pdf

External links

 
 
 
 

1639 births
1723 deaths
People from North End, Boston
People from colonial Boston
People from Dorchester, Massachusetts
17th-century Christian clergy
18th-century Christian clergy
American Congregationalist ministers
American people of English descent
American religious writers
American sermon writers
American Calvinist and Reformed theologians
Harvard College alumni
History of religion in the United States
Massachusetts colonial-era clergy
17th-century New England Puritan ministers
18th-century New England Puritan ministers
People of the Salem witch trials
Presidents of Harvard University
17th-century Calvinist and Reformed theologians
18th-century Calvinist and Reformed theologians
Burials in Boston
Mather family
American slave owners